Crossroads is an American half-hour alternative music video television program that aired on VH1 weekdays between the years 1994 and 1998. It premiered on October 31, 1994.

Overview
Originally called Darcy's Music, the program was hosted first by VJ Moon Zappa and then by VJ Amy Scott. The program was named after VH1's then-director of music programming, Darcy Sanders-Fulmer. The premise was that Fulmer (through an off-screen voice-over) picked her favorite videos which just happened to be alternative. Despite this, her voice was rarely heard. Most of the introductions were done by Moon, who constantly pointed out that the videos were Darcy's picks. 

During its second season the program was renamed Crossroads, a title the show kept for the rest of its run, and Moon Unit was dropped as the program's host. Crossroads adopted the instrumental break in the Jayhawks indie hit Blue as its theme song. 

1990s American music television series
1994 American television series debuts
1998 American television series endings
English-language television shows
VH1 original programming
VH1 music shows